was a legal scholar, a politician and cabinet minister in the pre-war Empire of Japan.

Okano was a native of Kōzuke Province (modern-day Gunma Prefecture). He graduated from the Kaisei Academy, followed by the Law School of Tokyo Imperial University, continuing on to graduate school to obtain a Doctor of law degree. He became professor of Tokyo Imperial University (See Keijirō Okano ). He worked as a bureaucrat at various cabinet ministries in the Meiji government, and was appointed to a seat in the Upper House of the Diet of Japan in 1908. He served as Director-General of the Cabinet Legislation Bureau under the 1st and 2nd Saionji administration (1906–1908; 1911–1912), and the 1st Yamamoto administration (1913). From 1913 to 1922, Okano served as Secretary to the Administrative Court.

In 1922, Okano was appointed Minister of Justice in the cabinet of Prime Minister Katō Tomosaburō. In the subsequent 2nd Yamamoto Gonnohyōe administration, he held the portfolios for Minister of Education and Minister of Agriculture and Commerce.
In October 1925, Okano was appointed to Vice-President of the Privy Council, and was awarded the title of baron (danshaku) in the kazoku peerage. He was also appointed President of the prestigious Imperial Academy. He died the same year.

 
 
 

1865 births
1925 deaths
Government ministers of Japan
Kaisei Academy alumni
Kazoku
Members of the House of Peers (Japan)
People from Gunma Prefecture
University of Tokyo alumni